Risto Kask (born 24 November 1985) is an economist and former civil servant and adviser to Minister of Public Administration of the Republic of Estonia. He is a founder of non-profit organization MTÜ Aita Nõrgemat and a board member of MTÜ Ettevõtluskool Noor Eesti.

From 2014–2017, he worked as a deputy head of the district of Nõmme at the Municipality of Tallinn. He also is a member of the Finance Committee of the Municipality of Tallinn. 

For the Estonian version of the Wiki page click here.



Membership in various organizations 
 From 2008 – MTÜ Aita Nõrgemat, board member
 From 2008 – MTÜ Roheline Noor, board member
 From 2011 – MTÜ Ettevõtluskool Noor Eesti, board member
 From 2015 – Kodumaa Kapitali HLÜ, member of audit committee
 From 2017 – Tallinn City Council, member of finance committee

Education 
He has a BA degree on Accounting and Finance and MBA degree on Corporate Finance, both acquired from the Estonian Entrepreneurship University of Applied Sciences. He is currently pursuing a PhD degree on Management at Estonian Business School.

As an author 
In 2015, he published a book Konnapoiste talvejutud. The book is for children aged 3–7, first edition was released in 720 units.

Athletic achievements 

 1999 Championship of underwater swimming, up to 16-yo class – I place
 2000 Championship of underwater swimming, up to 16-yo class – II place
 2004 Aikido 5kyu rank
 2005 Aikido 4kyu rank
 He is a member of jury of the competitions of "Eesti Suvepiiga ja Suvemees" and "Estonian Topmodel". In 2008, he was a member of the jury for "Manhunt Estonia"
 Triathlon Estonia 2022, Public distance III place

References 

1985 births
Living people
Estonian Centre Party politicians
21st-century Estonian politicians
Estonian male models
Politicians from Tallinn